Oneida Armory is a historic National Guard armory building located in Oneida in Madison County, New York. It is a structural steel frame with brick curtain walls, built in 1930. It was designed by state architect William Haugaard. It consists of a two-story administration building with an attached -story drill shed.  The administrative building features Tudor-inspired features such as a stone water table and a brick parapet with a stone cornice and stone coping encircling the building.

It was listed on the National Register of Historic Places in 1995.

References

Armories on the National Register of Historic Places in New York (state)
Tudor Revival architecture in New York (state)
Infrastructure completed in 1930
National Register of Historic Places in Madison County, New York